The Mazda CX-3 is a subcompact crossover SUV manufactured by Mazda. Based on the same platform as the Mazda2 (DJ/DL), it was revealed to the public with a full photo gallery on November 19, 2014, and first put on display two days later at the 2014 Los Angeles Auto Show, as a production vehicle for the model year of 2016.

Overview 
The CX-3 is offered with an array of engines, such as a 1.5-litre and 2.0-litre four-cylinder Skyactiv-G gasoline engine, and a 1.5 L Skyactiv-D diesel engine. CX-3 sales began in the United States in the end of 2015, as a model for 2016. It replaced the similar Mazda2 subcompact in the market in North America.

Across the model lineup, power is provided by an updated (2018) 2.0-litre Skyactiv-G engine that develops  and 148 lb ft (201 Nm) of torque. It is connected to a six speed automatic transmission that can be paired to an optional all wheel drive system.

In the United States, the entry level CX-3 Sport, Touring and Grand Touring all feature cruise control, power windows/lock, and a 60/40 split folding rear seat. Other highlights include a rearview camera, Bluetooth connectivity, and an infotainment system, Mazda Connect, with a 7-inch display as standard equipment.

In Asia, the CX-3 is sold in countries such as Malaysia, Singapore, Thailand, Philippines and Indonesia, and was introduced progressively from 2016. Similarly, the CX-3 is offered with a 2.0-litre four-cylinder gasoline engine or a 1.5-litre Skyactiv-D diesel engine.

Facelift 
The CX-3 received a minor facelift in 2018 including a new split horizontal chrome grille design, foglamps, tail lamps, minor tweaks to the chassis, added safety features, centre console armrest and replaced the manual handbrake with electric parking brakes.

For the 2020 model year in the United States, the Touring and Grand Touring trim levels were dropped in order to make room for the Mazda CX-30 leaving only the base Sport trim, with AWD being the only option. Newly standard equipment for the Sport trim include Apple Carplay and Android Auto as well as the i-Activesense safety suite.

Starting from 23 April 2020, Mazda added a 1.5-litre four-cylinder Skyactiv-G petrol engine option, for the market in Japan. The engine option was also introduced in Indonesia on 29 March 2021, in Egypt on 24 April 2021 and in Singapore from June 2021. In Malaysia, the 1.5-litre four-cylinder Skyactiv-G petrol engine option was introduced on 7 September 2022.

Discontinuation 
The Mazda CX-3 was discontinued in United States and Europe for 2022, marking 2021 as the final model year. It was replaced by the Mazda CX-30, which was introduced in 2020.

Awards and recognition 
 2015 Red Dot Design Award, Germany
 2016 Yahoo Autos Savvy Ride of the Year  
 2016 IIHS Top Safety Pick+ 
 2016 World Car Design of the Year Finalist
 2016 Car of the Year Thailand
 2016 Best Compact SUV, Fleet News Awards, UK
 2016 Automobile Journalists Association of Canada Canadian Utility Vehicle of the Year
 2016 Automobile Journalists Association of Canada Canadian Green Utility Vehicle of the Year
 2018 Best City SUV, Drive Car of the Year, Australia

Sales and production

CX-3 Racing Concept

The Mazda CX-3 Racing Concept was unveiled at the 2015 Tokyo Auto Salon, and a few days later at the North American International Auto Show in Detroit. It sports front lip and roof spoilers, side skirts, colored accents and larger 17 inch wheels and tires. The concept also rides on an adjustable suspension, and includes a racing air intake kit and a sports muffler.

References

External links 

 

CX-3
Cars introduced in 2015
2020s cars
Mini sport utility vehicles
Crossover sport utility vehicles
Front-wheel-drive vehicles
All-wheel-drive vehicles